Vossingen may refer to:

Vossingen, old name of the newspaper Søndre Bergenhus Amtstidende
Vossingen, short-lived newspaper from 1900 to 1902
Vossingen, old name of the newspaper Horda Tidend